Marie von Bunsen (17 January 1860 - 28 June 1941) was a British born German writer, watercolour painter and literary salon host.

Life 
Marie was born in London, United Kingdom, to a wealthy, liberal family. Her father was a Prussian politician and member of the Reichstag, while her mother, Emma von Birkbeck, came from a wealthy British banking family. The financial situation and social position of her family made it possible for her to spend extended periods time traveling abroad. In her youth she traveled in England, Italy and North Africa. She painted watercolours and from 1882 to 1927 she was a member of the Verein der Berliner Künstlerinnen (Association of Berlin Women Artists). She was for a time lady-in-waiting to Empress Victoria, but this ended when Emperor Friedrich III died in 1888.

In her house in the Tiergarten district of Berlin she received guests for Sunday breakfasts, and from 1905 onwards she organised a salon together with Hedwig Heyl and Else Schulhoff. She often travelled in Germany with her friends or alone. Between 1911 and 1914 she visited several countries in Asia and in 1934 she published "Im Fernen Osten" ("In the Far East") about her travels.

She also published biographies of members of royalty and of art critic John Ruskin (1903). In 1918 she joined the liberal Liberal Democratic Party. She was financially independent until the hyperinflation of 1923 and afterwards earned her living by writing and painting. In 1930 Harper and Brothers published her "Lost courts of Europe: The world I used to know, 1860-1912."  She died on 28 June 1941 in Berlin.

Works 
Marie von Bunsen produced a total of 66 works in 209 publications in 2 languages and has 1,020 library holdings. These are some of her most popular works:

In English: 
 Lost courts of Europe, the world I used to know, 1860-1912 (1930)

In German:

 Im Ruderboot durch Deutschland : Havel, Werra, Weser und Oder
 Die Welt in der ich lebte, Erinnerungen aus glücklichen Jahren 1860-1912
 Von kühlen Wassern, Rohr und Schilf : eine Ruderboot-Erzählung
 Wanderungen durch Deutschland. Eindrücke und Bilder aus meiner Skizzenmappe
 Maria Tudor. Das Lebensschicksal einer englischen Königin
 Kaiserin Augusta
 Frauenreisen in den Orient zu Beginn des 20. Jahrhunderts : weibliche Strategien der Erfahrung und textuellen Vermittlung kultureller Fremde
 Die Welt, in der ich lebte 1860 - 1912

 Articles and reviews in magazines and newspapers, etc. a. The future, Die Neue Rundschau, Deutsche Rundschau, North and South, Vossische Zeitung

Literature 

 Gertrud Bäumer: Marie von Bunsen farewell. In: The woman . 48, 1940/41, p. 346 f.
 Paul Fechter : The Berliner. Franckh'sche, Stuttgart 1943 (Marie von Bunsen: pp. 234–238)
 Petra Wilhelmy-Dollinger: The Berlin Salon in the 19th Century 1780–1914. de Gruyter, Berlin 1989
 Gerhard Krebs : Marie von Bunsen and Japan. In: Japanese Studies. Volume 2, 1990. Study, Munich 1991, pp. 259-268.
 Käthe, Paula and all the rest . A reference work. Ed. Association of Berlin Artists & Berlinische Galerie, Museum of Modern Art, Photography and Architecture. Berlin 1992 , p. 32 f.
A walk on the Landwehr Canal. be.bra, Berlin 2000 (“In a rowboat through Germany: Marie von Bunsen”, pp. 45–47).
 Bärbel Kuhn: Marital status: "single". Singular women and men in the middle class 1850–1914. In: L'Homme 5. Böhlau, Cologne 2000.
 Franka Schneider: Marie von Bunsen, a “knowing traveler”. Exploring the folkloric knowledge milieu in Berlin. In: Folklore Knowledge. Actors and Practices. Berliner Blätter 50, Berlin 2009, pp. 87–112.
 Reichs Handbuch der Deutschen Gesellschaft - The handbook of personalities in words and pictures. First volume, Deutscher Wirtschaftsverlag, Berlin 1930, .

Notes and references 

1860 births
1941 deaths
German writers
German artists